William Clyde Hitchcock (July 31, 1916 – April 9, 2006) was an American professional baseball infielder, coach, manager and scout. In Major League Baseball (MLB), he was primarily a third baseman, second baseman and shortstop who appeared in 703 games over nine years with five American League teams. After 18 years as a coach, manager (of the Baltimore Orioles and Atlanta Braves), and scout he became an executive in Minor League Baseball, serving as president of the Double-A Southern League from 1971–80. His older brother, Jimmy Hitchcock, played briefly for the 1938 Boston Bees.

Playing career
Born in Inverness, Alabama and a graduate of Auburn University, Hitchcock played all four infield positions during a nine-year American League active career. He broke in with the  Detroit Tigers, spent three years in the Army Air Force in the Pacific during World War II, and resumed his Major League career from 1946 to 1953. Overall, he batted .243 with 547 hits and five home runs in 703 games with the Tigers, Washington Senators, Boston Red Sox, St. Louis Browns and Philadelphia Athletics.

Managerial career
Between Triple-A managing assignments in 1954 and 1961, Hitchcock served a six-year (1955–60) term as the Tigers' third base coach.  He also became a footnote to one of the most bizarre personnel transactions in baseball annals.  On August 3, 1960, the Tigers and Cleveland Indians traded their managers, Jimmy Dykes for Joe Gordon.  Hitchcock served as Detroit's interim skipper for one game while Gordon was en route from his Cleveland assignment, and the Tigers defeated the New York Yankees, 12–2, on August 3 at Yankee Stadium.

In , Hitchcock was named the full-time manager of the Baltimore Orioles. But in his two seasons at the helm, the ballclub barely broke the .500 mark (163–161). Hitchcock was dismissed on September 29 after the final game of the 1963 campaign in which the fourth-place Orioles finished  games behind the Yankees, and moved into Baltimore's minor league department as field coordinator.  Then he became a scout for the Braves, whose general manager at the time was former Tiger player and executive John McHale.

Hitchcock began the  season as a coach under Bobby Bragan during the Braves' first season in Atlanta. But when they won only 52 of their first 111 games, Bragan was fired on August 9 and Hitchcock took over. His career managing record was 274 wins, 261 losses (.514). Hitchcock then scouted for McHale and the Montreal Expos in 1968–71 before taking over as president of the Southern League.

Managerial record

Southern League presidency
Hitchcock became president of the Southern League in August 1971. During his presidency, the league added new teams, expanded its playoffs, and introduced split-season play. Other improvements included stadium refurbishments and efforts to make the league more family-friendly. Attendance figures rose dramatically during his tenure, from 333,500 in 1971 to over 1.7 million in 1980. The Southern League championship trophy is named after Hitchcock, and in 1980 he was presented with the King of Baseball award given by Minor League Baseball. He stepped down from the presidency in 1980.

College athletics
In addition to his baseball resume, Hitchcock also made a name for himself in college football and golf. As an All-Conference tailback, he led Auburn to its first bowl game (a 7-7 tie against Villanova on January 1, 1937). Later in life, he established the Billy Hitchcock Golf Tournament at his alma mater. In recognition of his contribution to the school, Auburn renamed its renovated baseball stadium "Hitchcock Field" in 2003. Also in that year, Baseball America named it the best college baseball facility in the country.

Death
Hitchcock died in Opelika, Alabama at age 89.

References

External links

Billy Hitchcock at SABR (Baseball BioProject)

1916 births
2006 deaths
American Presbyterians
Atlanta Braves coaches
Atlanta Braves managers
Auburn Tigers baseball players
Auburn Tigers football players
Baltimore Orioles managers
Baseball players from Alabama
Boston Red Sox players
Buffalo Bisons (minor league) managers
Buffalo Bisons (minor league) players
Detroit Tigers coaches
Detroit Tigers managers
Detroit Tigers players
Kansas City Blues (baseball) players
Major League Baseball first base coaches
Major League Baseball infielders
Major League Baseball third base coaches
Milwaukee Braves scouts
Minor league baseball executives
Montreal Expos scouts
People from Bullock County, Alabama
People from Opelika, Alabama
Philadelphia Athletics players
Players of American football from Alabama
St. Louis Browns players
Southern League (1964–present)
United States Army Air Forces personnel of World War II
United States Army Air Forces soldiers
Washington Senators (1901–1960) players